Hillside, a private school in Addis Ababa, Ethiopia, offers preschool, primary, secondary and higher education.  It meets in 3 different locations in order to keep teacher student ratio low.

In August 2016, Hillside hosted a "Cosmic Ray Workshop", a teacher-training workshop sponsored by QuarkNet.

As of September 2020, the school was closed by the Ethiopian government as part of COVID-19 measures. Registration and entrance exams were conducted observing social distancing precautions.

References 

Schools in Addis Ababa
Elementary and primary schools in Ethiopia
Secondary schools in Ethiopia